Peter Albert Michael Haden-Guest, 4th Baron Haden-Guest (29 August 1913 – 8 April 1996) was a British United Nations diplomat and member of the House of Lords. A dancer and choreographer who performed as Peter Michael with the Markova-Dolin Ballet, Ballet Divertissement, Ballet Theatre, Ballet Joos, and the Repertory Dance Theatre from 1935 until 1945, Haden-Guest was a United Nations official from 1946 to 1972. He inherited his title in 1987.

Lord Haden-Guest was the fourth son of The 1st Baron Haden-Guest and Muriel Carmel (née Goldsmid), daughter of Albert Goldsmid (Muriel was the 1st Baron's second wife). Peter Haden-Guest's father was a convert to Judaism who had later "renounced" the religion. Haden-Guest's maternal grandparents were both converts to Judaism, though both were of partial Jewish ancestry. Haden-Guest was an atheist.

Haden-Guest was married twice, his wives being:

 Elisabeth Wolpert (née Louise Ruth Wolpert, 1910–2002), a German-born writer and socialite better known as Elisabeth Furse; she and Peter Haden-Guest married in 1939 and divorced in 1945. They had one child, Anthony Haden-Guest (2 February 1937–)
 Jean Pauline Hindes (1921–2017), whom he married in 1945. They had three children: Christopher (1948–), Nicholas (1951–), and Elissa (1953–).

Upon his death, Lord Haden-Guest was succeeded by his son Christopher, an actor who is married to the actress Jamie Lee Curtis. Lord Haden-Guest's eldest son, New York journalist Anthony Haden-Guest, was born before his parents were married and was thus ineligible for the title.

References

1913 births
1996 deaths
Ballet choreographers
English atheists
English male ballet dancers
English Jews
British officials of the United Nations
Peter
4
Jewish atheists